Brachyglottis arborescens, the Three Kings rangiora, is a species of flowering plant in the family Asteraceae. It is endemic to New Zealand, where it is known only from the Three Kings Islands.

References

arborescens
Endangered flora of New Zealand
Taxonomy articles created by Polbot
Endemic flora of New Zealand
Three Kings Islands